William Craig (November 13, 1918 – January 13, 2016) was an American academic and philosopher, who taught at the University of California, Berkeley, in Berkeley, California. His research interests included mathematical logic, and the philosophy of science, and he is best known for the Craig interpolation theorem.

Biography
William Craig was born in Nuremberg, German Empire, on November 13, 1918. He graduated from Harvard University with a Ph.D in 1951. He married Julia Rebecca Dwight Wilson and had four children: Ruth, Walter, Sarah, and Deborah. In 1959 he moved to UC Berkeley. He died on January 13, 2016, at the age of 97.

Achievements

Craig is particularly remembered in two theorems that bear his name:
 the Craig interpolation theorem, and
 Craig's theorem, also known as Craig's axiomatization theorem or Craig's reaxiomatization theorem.

See also
 American philosophy
 List of American philosophers

References

External links 
 Official Berkeley page
 A conference in honor of William Craig
 Some Publications DBLP
 

1918 births
2016 deaths
20th-century American male writers
20th-century American mathematicians
20th-century American philosophers
20th-century educators
20th-century essayists
20th-century German male writers
20th-century German mathematicians
20th-century German non-fiction writers
20th-century German philosophers
21st-century American male writers
21st-century American mathematicians
21st-century American philosophers
21st-century educators
21st-century essayists
American educators
American logicians
American male essayists
American male non-fiction writers
Analytic philosophers
Computability theorists
German educators
German emigrants to the United States
German logicians
German male essayists
German male non-fiction writers
Harvard University alumni
Philosophers of logic
Philosophers of mathematics
Philosophers of science
Philosophy academics
Proof theorists
University of California, Berkeley College of Letters and Science faculty
Writers from Nuremberg